Azhagaana Ponnuthan is a 2010 Indian Tamil-language romance film written and directed by Thiru that stars Namitha and newcomer Kartheesh, with R. Parthiban playing an older version of Karthick's role. The film is an unofficial remake of the Italian film Malèna, written by Luciano Vincenzoni and Giuseppe Tornatore. The film's score and soundtrack composed by Sundar C Babu. The film, produced by K. Keshavan, was released on 12 March 2010.

Plot
Karthik (R. Parthiepan) appears in the very first reel recollecting his travels with a woman whom he had developed an affinity in his teens. A flashback takes one to Kodaikanal where a younger Karthik (Karteesh) falls instantly for a gorgeous woman called Jennifer (Namitha), who is older to him. She is admired and respected by everyone, especially men. It is all but Karthik's wild imagination is the rest. Karthik sings duets with Jennifer and runs behind her. However, in the latter half, he goes into a shell, brooding over his love and beloved. Twists and turns reveal that Jennifer's husband has died in the Indo-Pak War of 1971. What happens then forms the climax.

Cast

Namitha as Jennifer
Kartheesh as Young Karthik
R. Parthiepan as Karthik
Nizhalgal Ravi as Karthik's father
Abhishek
Mayilswamy
Vasu Vikram
Shyam Ganesh
Balu Anand
Bava Lakshmanan
Nellai Siva
Bayilvan Ranganathan
Victoria
Nisha
Lakshya

Production
The film was launched in 2006 and was finished in 2009 due to delay. Newcomer Rajkarthik was selected to play the lead role while R. Parthiban was selected to play his elder version.

Post-release, Thiru, director of the film claimed that his film was a damp squib due to Namitha. Thiru said that Namitha refused to star in the film after several scenes in the film were canned. When he filed a complaint at the Producers’ Council, it was decided that Namitha should complete the film. Thiru says that he had to modify the story and the climax due Namitha's indifferent behavior. He adds that Namitha was responsible for the huge losses that the producer of Azhagana Ponnuthan had incurred. According to Thiru, the climax was not what he had in mind and film was cut short by 20 minutes.

Soundtrack
The music was composed by Sundar C. Babu. Celebrities who were present during audio release lashed out against Namitha for not participating in the audio release.

"Vaanathu Nilavu" - Karthik
"Aadupuli Aattam" - Afsal
"Misia" - Naresh Iyer
"Sami Kodangi" - Ganga

References

External links
 

2010 films
2010s Tamil-language films
Films based on works by Luciano Vincenzoni
Films scored by Sundar C. Babu
Indian remakes of Italian films